Thiruvambady Convention Centre is located at Marar Road in Thrissur city of Kerala state. The convention centre was built by Thiruvambady Devaswom, that manages day-to-day administration and functions of Thiruvambadi Sri Krishna Temple, Thrissur.

The main block consists of a lobby, centralized air-conditioned auditorium named "Nandanam" which can seat more than 1100 people  and a dining hall "Dwaraka" that can accommodate more than 500 people  at a time. The second block named "Sreevalsam"  annexed to convention centre has a mini hall, 22 living rooms, and cafeteria. This edifice also offers parking facility for around 140 cars within the compound.

See also
 Thiruvambadi Sri Krishna Temple

References

External links

Convention centres in India
Buildings and structures in Thrissur